Triethyl phosphonoacetate is a reagent for organic synthesis used in the Horner-Wadsworth-Emmons reaction (HWE) or the Horner-Emmons modification.

Triethyl phosphonoacetate can be added dropwise to sodium methoxide solution to prepare a phosphonate anion.  It has an acidic proton that can easily be abstracted by a weak base. When used in an HWE reaction with a carbonyl the resulting alkene formed is usually the E alkene, and is generated with excellent regioselectivity.

References

Phosphonate esters
Reagents for organic chemistry
Ethyl esters